Lance J. Horbach (born February 14, 1958, in Grundy Center, Iowa) is the Iowa State Representative from the 40th District. He has served in the Iowa House of Representatives since 1998.

Horbach currently serves on several committees in the Iowa House - the Economic Growth committee; the Judiciary committee; and the Labor committee, where he is the ranking member.  He also serves on the Justice System Appropriations Subcommittee.  His prior political experience includes serving as a Tama County Zoning Commissioner from 1996 to 1998.

A Republican, Horbach was re-elected in 2006 with 6,249 votes (55%), defeating Democratic opponent Sharon Owens.

Early life and education
Horbach was raised in Tama-Toeldo. He graduated from South Tama High School and received his BS from Iowa State University.

Career
Outside politics Horbach works for the Independent Insurance Services in Marshalltown, Iowa.  He began working here in 2000 and is in charge of managing the IIS Nursing Home Program.

Organizations
He is a member of the following organizations:
Eagles Club
Lions Club
Farm Bureau

Family
Horbach is married to his wife Jody and together they have four children: Amy, Kendra, Melissa and Nick. They also have eight grandchildren.

References

External links
 Representative Lance Horbach official Iowa General Assembly site
 
Profile at Iowa House Republicans

Republican Party members of the Iowa House of Representatives
Living people
1958 births
Iowa State University alumni
People from Grundy Center, Iowa
People from Tama, Iowa